The Canton Main Street Historic District is a national historic district located at Canton, Haywood County, North Carolina.  It includes 34 contributing buildings and one other contributing structure and includes architecture by Benton & Benton.   It includes Early Commercial architecture and Late 19th and 20th Century Revivals architecture.  Located in the district is the separately listed Colonial Theater.  Other notable buildings include the P L & S Building (1932), Champion Fibre Company Office Building (1918), Champion Bank and Trust (c. 1925), Imperial Hotel (c. 1885; additions 1916 and 1925), and the former United States Post Office (1939).

It was listed on the National Register of Historic Places in 2005.

References

Commercial buildings on the National Register of Historic Places in North Carolina
Historic districts on the National Register of Historic Places in North Carolina
Buildings designated early commercial in the National Register of Historic Places
Geography of Haywood County, North Carolina
National Register of Historic Places in Haywood County, North Carolina